The 1945 Ottawa Rough Riders finished in 1st place in the Interprovincial Rugby Football Union with a 5–1 record but lost the IRFU Finals to the Toronto Argonauts by a total point score of 33–18.

Regular season

Standings

Schedule

Postseason

Playoffs

References

Ottawa Rough Riders seasons
1945 Canadian football season by team